Bell Cow Lake (sometimes written as Bellcow) is a reservoir located within the city limits of Chandler, Oklahoma, in a section of the city located to the northwest of its central district, just off Interstate 44 and Oklahoma State Highway 18.

The lake was constructed on Bell Cow Creek for flood control, water supply, recreation, and fish and wildlife purposes. Four recreational areas cover another , offering boating, fishing, swimming, camping, picnicking, and horseback riding.

References

Bodies of water of Lincoln County, Oklahoma
Lakes of Oklahoma
Infrastructure completed in 1993
Chandler, Oklahoma